Crematogaster pilosa species of ant in the subfamily Myrmicinae. It is native along the southern Atlantic coast of the United States and some interior areas. These polydomous ants have been found living in tidal marshes, wet meadows and other environments in plant stems, logs, and fallen branches.

References

External links

Insects of the United States
Hymenoptera of North America
Insects described in 1895
pilosa
Taxonomy articles created by Polbot